A taula (meaning 'table' in Catalan) is a Stonehenge-esque stone monument found on the Balearic island of Menorca. Taulas can be up to 5 metres high and consist of a vertical pillar (a monolith or several smaller stones on top of each other) with a horizontal stone lying on it. A U-shaped wall often encloses the structure.

They were built by the Talaiotic culture between 500 BC and 300 BC.

Their exact cultural meaning remains unknown, but they probably had religious and/or astronomical purposes. Most of the taulas face south, which seems to suggest some astronomical meaning. Archeologist Michael Hoskin has suggested the taulas may have been part of an ancient healing cult. They are frequently found near talaiots.

The first author who wrote about these structures was Juan Ramis in his book Antigüedades célticas de la isla de Menorca ("Celtic Antiquities of the Island of Menorca"), which was published 1818, being the first book in the Spanish language entirely devoted to Prehistory.

Examples include those at Torre Trencada, Talatí de Dalt, Torrellissá Nou, Trepucó, and the site at Torralba d'en Salord.

Location
Alfurinet
Algaiarens
Bellaventura
Biniac Vell
Binicrodell Nou
Binimaimut
Binimassó
Binisafullet
Cavalleria
Cotaina
Es Tudons
La Beltrana
Na Comerma de sa Garita
Sa Torreta de Tramuntana
Sant Agustí Vell
So na Caçana Est
So na Caçana Oest
Son Angladó
Son Bernardí
Son Catlar
Son Olivaret Nou
Son Rotger
Talatí de Dalt
Torralba d'en Salort
Torralbenc Vell
Torre d'en Galmés
Torrellafuda
Torrellisà
Torretrencada
Torrevella d'en Lozano
Trepucó
Sa Cudia Cremada

See also
 Dolmen
 Megalith
 Menhir

References

External links
 Megalithic Menorca. Discovering Menorca.
 Guide to Menorca: Prehistory

Megalithic monuments in Spain
Archaeological sites in Spain
Iron Age cultures of Europe
Prehistory of the Balearic Islands
Prehistoric sites in Spain
Iron Age Spain